Lupin the Third Part II, also known as Shin Lupin III or simply as Lupin III for the American market, is a Japanese anime series based on the manga by Monkey Punch and is produced by Tokyo Movie Shinsha. The third season, which contains 52 episodes, aired between October 8, 1979 and October 6, 1980 on NTV. In 1994, episodes 145 and 155 (which were directed by Hayao Miyazaki under a pseudonym) appeared on VHS in the United States, dubbed in English, under the title Lupin III's Greatest Capers. These episodes marked Miyazaki's final involvement with the franchise. The opening theme is "Theme from Lupin III '80" by Yuji Ohno while the ending theme is "Love Is Everything" by Noboru Kimura.


Episode list

Notes

References
Specific

General

1979 Japanese television seasons
1980 Japanese television seasons
Lupin the Third Part II Season 4